Lucky Day is the sixth studio album released by Jamaican singer Shaggy. It was released on October 29, 2002. The album peaked at number 24 on the Billboard 200 and later reached Gold certification. Three singles were released from the album: "Hey Sexy Lady", "Strength of a Woman" and "Get My Party On". The album featured guest appearances from Shaggy's longtime collaborators Brian and Tony Gold, as well as a guest appearance from Chaka Khan. The song "We Are the Ones" was included on the album "Barbie Mix" which was released to promote the My Scene dolls.

MCA Records hoped that Lucky Day could stop a slump in sales at the label for 2002. While the album was a moderate commercial success (selling 352,000 copies by July 2005), it did not sell as well as hoped, resulting in MCA's president, Jay Boberg, resigning from his position at the label in January 2003, and ultimately led to MCA being merged into Geffen Records in June 2003.

Track listing

Notes
  signifies co-producer
  signifies remix producer

Charts

Weekly charts

Year-end charts

Certifications and sales

References

External links
 

Shaggy (musician) albums
2002 albums